Antun Sorkočević (12 December 1775 – February 1841 in Paris, France) was a diplomat, writer, composer and member of Ragusan nobility (chevalier des odres de Saint Maurice et de Saint Lazare demeurant a Paris). He was Medo Pucić's cousin, and a good friend of Marko Bruerović. He also held the position of Mayor of Dubrovnik during the French Empire.

Sorkočević was born in Dubrovnik.  His father was Luka Sorkočević and mother, Paula Bonda (1743-1811). Like his father, he was a composer. Antun studied in Rome, and after 1806 led the Republic of Ragusa's diplomatic representation in Paris where he was the last ambassador of the Republic in France, where he spent 35 years of his life. In Paris he wrote Postanak i propast Republike Dubrovačke (The Rise and Fall of the Republic of Dubrovnik) in which he proposed that Dubrovnik should join Boka Kotorska, Montenegro and Serbia to make it one nation. The pamphlet was banned in Austria. He also put forth the idea of creating a separate region comprising the Republic and Boka Kotorska under the Austrian Empire after French occupation of these lands (Illyrian provinces).

Antun first married Catterina Schneider in 1820 in Venice. His second wife was Paola Labbia from Venice. He had one daughter, Maria (b. 1812), whose mother remains unknown.

Author of numerous publications, he became a member of Académie Celtique in 1806 and the Société des Antiquaires in 1828. Among other books he published such as Mémoire sur la langue et les moeurs des peuples slaves, Fragments sur l'histoire et la littérature de la République de Raguse et sur la langue slave, (in Croatian, Fragmenti o političkoj i književnoj povijesti stare Dubrovačke republike i o slavenskom jeziku). In 1838, he translated Ivan Gundulić's Osman into French and became the author of the earliest  piano sonatas. He died in Paris.

His collection also contains abundant information relevant to the two composers' life and work (Luka i Antun Sorkočević). Antun wrote four symphonies and numerous pieces for chamber music.

Work
Fragments sur l'histoire politique et littéraire de l'ancienne république de Raguse et sur la langue slave. Paris, 1839.

See also

 Republic of Ragusa
 List of notable Ragusans
 Dubrovnik
 Dalmatia
 History of Dalmatia
 Luka Sorkočević
 House of Sorkočević

References

Antun
People from Dubrovnik
1775 births
1841 deaths
Mayors of Dubrovnik
Croatian composers
People from the Republic of Ragusa
Ragusan nobility
Ragusan diplomats
Ragusan writers
French people of Croatian descent
18th-century Croatian nobility
19th-century Croatian nobility